In calculus, the power rule is used to differentiate functions of the form , whenever  is a real number. Since differentiation is a linear operation on the space of differentiable functions, polynomials can also be differentiated using this rule. The power rule underlies the Taylor series as it relates a power series with a function's derivatives.

Statement of the power rule
Let  be a function satisfying  for all , where . Then, 

The power rule for integration states that 

for any real number . It can be derived by inverting the power rule for differentiation. In this equation C is any constant.

Proofs

Proof for real exponents
Although it is feasible to define the value as the limit of a sequence of rational powers that approach the irrational power whenever we encounter such a power, or as the least upper bound of a set of rational powers less than the given power, this type of definition is not amenable to differentiation.

If , then , where  is the natural logarithm function, the inverse function of the exponential function, as demonstrated by Euler.

This necessarily leads to the same result. Note that because  does not have a conventional definition when  is not a rational number, irrational power functions are not well defined for negative bases. In addition, as rational powers of −1 with even denominators (in lowest terms) are not real numbers, these expressions are only real valued for rational powers with odd denominators (in lowest terms).

For the two cases that do exist, the values agree with the value of the existing power rule at 0, so no exception need be made.

The exclusion of the expression  (the case x = 0) from our scheme of exponentiation is due to the fact that the function  has no limit at (0,0), since  approaches 1 as x approaches 0, while  approaches 0 as y approaches 0. Thus, it would be problematic to ascribe any particular value to it, as the value would contradict one of the two cases, dependent on the application. It is traditionally left undefined.

Proofs for integer exponents

Proof by induction (natural numbers)
Let .

When , 

When ,  

Therefore, the base case holds either way.

Suppose the statement holds for some natural number k, i.e. 

When ,By the principle of mathematical induction, the statement is true for all natural numbers n.

Proof by binomial theorem (natural numbers)
Let , where .

Then,

Generalization to negative integer exponents
For a negative integer n, let  so that m is a positive integer.
Using the reciprocal rule,In conclusion, for any integer ,

Generalization to rational exponents 
Upon proving that the power rule holds for integer exponents, the rule can be extended to rational exponents.

Proof by chain rule
This proof is composed of two steps that involve the use of the chain rule for differentiation.
 Let , where . Then . By the chain rule, . This can be generalized to rational exponents of the form  by applying the power rule for integer exponents using the chain rule, as shown in the next step.
 Let , where  so that . By the chain rule,  
From the above results, we can conclude that when  is a rational number,

Proof by implicit differentiation
A more straightforward generalization of the power rule to rational exponents makes use of implicit differentiation.

Let , where  so that .

Then,Differentiating both sides of the equation with respect to ,Solving for ,Since ,Applying laws of exponents,Thus, letting , we can conclude that  when  is a rational number.

History
At the time, they were treatises on determining the area between the graph of a rational power function and the horizontal axis. With hindsight, however, it is considered the first general theorem of calculus to be discovered. The power rule for differentiation was derived by Isaac Newton and Gottfried Wilhelm Leibniz, each independently, for rational power functions in the mid 17th century, who both then used it to derive the power rule for integrals as the inverse operation. This mirrors the conventional way the related theorems are presented in modern basic calculus textbooks, where differentiation rules usually precede integration rules.

Although both men stated that their rules, demonstrated only for rational quantities, worked for all real powers, neither sought a proof of such, as at the time the applications of the theory were not concerned with such exotic power functions, and questions of convergence of infinite series were still ambiguous.

representing the area between the rectangular hyperbola  and the x-axis, was a logarithmic function, whose base was eventually discovered to be the transcendental number e.

Generalizations

Complex power functions

In addition, if  is a positive integer, then there is no need for a branch cut: one may define , or define positive integral complex powers through complex multiplication, and show that  for all complex , from the definition of the derivative and the binomial theorem.

However, due to the multivalued nature of complex power functions for non-integer exponents, one must be careful to specify the branch of the complex logarithm being used. In addition, no matter which branch is used, if  is not a positive integer, then the function is not differentiable at 0.

See also

References

Notes

Citations

Further reading

  Larson, Ron; Hostetler, Robert P.; and Edwards, Bruce H. (2003). Calculus of a Single Variable: Early Transcendental Functions (3rd edition). Houghton Mifflin Company. .

Articles containing proofs
Differentiation rules
Mathematical identities
Theorems in analysis
Theorems in calculus